Flossmoor School District 161 is a school district headquartered in Chicago Heights, Illinois, in the Chicago metropolitan area. It serves Chicago Heights and Flossmoor.

Homewood-Flossmoor High School is separate, controlled by its own school district.

Schools
Junior high:
 Parker Junior High School
Elementary:
 Flossmoor Hills Elementary School
 Heather Hill Elementary School
 Serena Hills Elementary School
 Western Avenue Elementary School

References

External links
 

School districts in Cook County, Illinois